Blind is the second studio album by the Sundays. It was released by Parlophone on 19 October 1992 in the UK, then in the US by Geffen the following day. It is often considered the darkest and most experimental of The Sundays' albums, noted for its melancholic lyrics and closer resemblance to the darker dream pop work of artists such as Cocteau Twins. The title of the album is from a lyric in the song "24 Hours".

The album peaked at No. 15 on the UK Albums Chart.

Production
The album was co-produced by Dave Anderson.

Critical reception
Trouser Press wrote that "while increased confidence and ambition make Wheeler’s singing more technically accomplished, her development from adolescent wonder to adult aplomb deducts some of the band’s gravity-defying magic."

Track listing
All songs by David Gavurin and Harriet Wheeler, except "Wild Horses", written by Mick Jagger and Keith Richards.

 "I Feel" – 4:02 
 "Goodbye" – 4:45 
 "Life & Soul" – 2:37  
 "More" – 2:43
 "On Earth" – 2:23
 "God Made Me" – 4:50 
 "Love" – 4:33
 "What Do You Think?" – 3:57
 "24 Hours" – 3:29
 "Blood on My Hands" – 3:40
 "Medicine" – 3:42
 "Wild Horses" – 4:45
The final track only appears on American release of this album and as a B-side of the UK single version of "Goodbye".

Personnel
 Harriet Wheeler – vocals, production
 David Gavurin – guitar, production
 Paul Brindley – bass
 Patrick Hannan – drums
 Lindsay Jamieson – tambourine
 Dave Anderson – engineer, production

Charts

References

External links
 

The Sundays albums
1992 albums
Parlophone albums